Alexander Agyarkwa Ameyaw (born 18 July 2000) is a Ghanaian professional footballer who plays as a midfielder.
He currently plays for Selangor in the Malaysia Super League, on loan from Accra Lions.

Club career

Early year
Agyarkwa was born in the Mampong Municipal District. He is a youth product of the Ghanaian clubs Phar Rangers in Division One League, before moving to the youth academy of Accra Lions in 2021.

Selangor

After spend half season with Accra Lions, Agyarkwa join the Malaysian club Selangor in the middle of 2021 on a season-long loan deal. He started with appearances for the reserve side Selangor II, where he impressed with three goals in five games. Having impressed the coach Karsten Neitzel, he finally made his debut in the first team on 3 November 2021, playing full 90-minutes in a 2–1 away win against Kuching City.

Career statistics

Club

References

External links 
 

2000 births
Living people
Ghanaian footballers
Association football midfielders